Hermano João "Nano" da Silva Ramos (born 7 December 1925) is a French-Brazilian former racing driver. He had a French mother and a Brazilian father.

Career 
Da Silva Ramos was born in Paris, France. He first ventured into motor racing, driving an MG TC, in March 1947, when at the age of 21, he competed in the Interlagos Grand Prix in Brazil. During 1953 he began racing an Aston Martin DB2/4 in sports car races in France. In 1954 at Montlhéry, he crossed the line in second place in the Paris Cup but was winner of the Coupe de Montlhery. In the same year, he also participated in the Le Mans 24 hour race, with Jean-Paul Colas as his co-driver, being forced to retire after 14 hours following a rear axle failure. Also in 1954, he ran out of fuel whilst leading the Tour de France Auto and retired with a damaged engine in the Rally of Morocco. Later in the year in the Salon Cup, in which he also had to retire, he drove a Gordini Type 18. In 1955 he (with co-driver Lucas) were disqualified for speeding in the Monte Carlo Rally, eventually classified 46th and 4th in class, won the Coupe de Montlhery again, won the Rally Sable-Solesmes and was 5th in the GT class of the Mille Miglia with co-driver Vidille.
 
Da Silva Ramos participated in seven Formula One World Championship Grands Prix, debuting on 19 June 1955 and scoring a total of two championship points.

Complete Formula One World Championship results
(key)

References

1925 births
Living people
Brazilian racing drivers
Brazilian Formula One drivers
24 Hours of Le Mans drivers
12 Hours of Reims drivers
Gordini Formula One drivers
World Sportscar Championship drivers
French emigrants to Brazil